HMS Derwent was a  Type III destroyer escort of the Royal Navy. She was built by Vickers-Armstrongs, in Barrow-in-Furness, and served during the Second World War. In March 1943, she was badly damaged while anchored in Tripoli harbour by aircraft and beached to prevent her from sinking. Temporarily repaired and towed to England, further repair work was halted in January 1945, and she was broken up for scrap in 1947.

The "Hunt" class were named after British fox and stag hunts, in this case, the Derwent hunt Ryedale, North Yorkshire. In February 1942, she was adopted by the civil community of Easthampstead, Berkshire, after a National Savings campaign.

Construction and design
Derwent was one of seven Type III Hunt-class destroyers ordered for the Royal Navy on 4 July 1940, as part of the 1940 War Emergency Programme. The Hunt class was meant to fill the Royal Navy's need for a large number of small destroyer-type vessels capable of both convoy escort and operations with the fleet. The Type III Hunts differed from the previous Type II ships in replacing a twin  gun mount by two torpedo tubes to improve their ability to operate as destroyers.

Displacement was  standard and  under full load.

Main gun armament was four 4-in QF Mk XVI dual purpose guns in two twin mounts, with a quadruple 2-pounder "pom-pom" and three  Oerlikon cannons providing close-in anti-aircraft fire. Two  torpedo tubes were fitted in a single twin mount, while two depth charge chutes, four depth charge throwers and 70 depth charges comprised the ship's anti-submarine armament. Type 291 and Type 285 radars was fitted, as was Type 128 sonar.

Derwent was laid down at Vickers Armstrong's Barrow-in-Furness shipyard on 12 December 1940, was launched on 22 August 1941, and was completed on 24 April 1942.

Service history
Derwent completed acceptance trials, calibrations and worked-up with her crew during May 1942, before joining convoy WS19P in Clyde for Atlantic passage.

In August 1942, Derwent was part of the escort for the Malta relief convoy WS21S during Operation Pedestal, being assigned as part of Force X, which was intended to escort the convoy from Gibraltar, through the Sicilian Narrows to the vicinity of Malta, where escort duties would be taken over by Malta based-ships. Derwent, together with the destroyers  and  escorted the damaged Nigeria back to Gibraltar.

Loss
On 19 March 1943, while anchored in Tripoli harbour, Libya, Derwent was hit by a pattern-running torpedo, claimed to be dropped either by an Italian aircraft, or by a German Ju 88 of KG 30, KG 54 or KG 77. The freighter Ocean Voyager (7,174 grt), and the Greek steamer Vavara (1,654 grt) were also sunk during this attack. Derwent sustained major damage being holed on the port side causing flooding in her Boiler Room and six fatal casualties.

She was beached to stop her from sinking, temporarily repaired and towed to England. More repairs were carried out in HM Dockyard Devonport but the decision was taken to suspend work in January 1945, and she was reduced to the reserve and scrapped in 1947.

Notes

Publications
 
 
 
 
 
 
 
 
 
 

 

1941 ships
Ships built in Barrow-in-Furness
Hunt-class destroyers of the Royal Navy
World War II destroyers of the United Kingdom
Maritime incidents in March 1943